Happy? is the sixth studio album by English rock band Public Image Ltd, released in 1987.

Cover artwork
The cover art by Richard Evans is a homage to the style of Austrian artist Friedensreich Hundertwasser, and an acknowledgement is made in the liner notes.

Track by track commentary by band members
"Seattle":
John Lydon (1989): “The Happy? LP did have a doom, death and destruction feel about it, very crunchy, tanks rolling, very military in its approach.” “Happy? was much more militant in its approach, kind of pissed off at the world. That was the attitude [...] Bear in mind that Happy? was the first album that we as a band had done, so we were sort of being very cagey with each other in the writing. Nobody really let rip.”
John McGeoch (1987/90) “We only went into the studio when all songs were written. "Seattle" was written in Seattle.” “We started to make the album in '87, and writing together was just an organic development from the way we were working together on the Album material on tour [...] I don't think 9 was a bummer, but looking back with the luxury of hindsight, I'm more content with Happy?”
Lu Edmonds (1999): “It's very difficult for me to listen to that stuff now without thinking what it should have been, or what it could have been. It sounds really '80s to me, an '80s rock production. Actually I hear more production and the studio equipment than I can hear of the band, and that's the disappointment for me [...] I think there was potential for Happy? to be a great album but I think we had the wrong producer. I mean, Gary Langan's a very good producer, a really nice guy. But he was the wrong guy because in the end he ended up squashing all the scruffy bits [...] What Gary did was he filled it all up, so everything was all sort of Art of Noise [...] [John Lydon] was in this sort of mood where he was very hands off, he just wanted to come in and do his vocal, because in a way I think that's what happened with Album, and it was a revelation for him, it was a great experience for him [...] I think he was very missed in the creative process. He wouldn't be there, it was left to us to come up with grooves and little tunes [...] It felt like John wasn't there.”
Allan Dias (2004): “A song like "Seattle", which came from a couple of riffs that Bruce and Lu Edmonds had, they brought it to me and I put a bass line on it, sitting on a bed in a hotel room! It was a nice bouncy groove, but it was nothing until John sang on that. Once he added some vocals to it, I was flipped out, it just became amazing.”
"The Body":
John Lydon (1987): “It's about people who have babies and don't realise it's a life they're dealing with. The second verse is a direct lift from that play Cathy Come Home.” “Woman have the right to have abortions, period! This is somewhere where no one should interfere, it should never be considered illegal. But then, you shouldn't be able to get yourself into that position in the first place. It's only ignorance and lack of education about contraception that leads to these disasters.”

Related tracks
"Selfish Rubbish" (single B-side):
John Lydon (1987): “I'm definitely not interested in the extreme left cos that's just selfish rubbish – 'I've got nothing, therefore no one will have anything!' It's inverted selfish rubbish, so fuck off!”

"The Suit" (new version)/"Religion" (new version) (single B-sides):
John Lydon (1992): [about a planned album of re-recorded PIL songs Renovations] “We put that on hold. Then Virgin slapped The Greatest Hits, So Far on us, which was an annoyance – it was, you couldn't have both albums out at the same time. You'll just have to be patient, it'll be unleashed soon because some of those songs could stand the treatment.”
Lu Edmonds (1999): “There was Renovations, I mixed a lot of those tracks, it seemed like a good idea at the time [...] I mixed "Religion".”

Track listing
All tracks composed by Dias, Edmonds, McGeoch, Lydon and Smith

Personnel
Public Image Ltd.
John Lydon – vocals
John McGeoch – guitar
Lu Edmonds – guitar, keyboards
Allan Dias – bass
Bruce Smith – drums

Charts

United Kingdom
Happy? briefly entered the UK Albums Chart, where it stayed for 2 weeks and reached No. 40 on 26 September 1987.
The single “Seattle” entered the UK Singles Chart, where it stayed for 4 weeks and reached No. 47 on 22 August 1987.
The single “The Body” did not chart.

United States
Happy? entered the Billboard 200, where it stayed for 10 weeks and reached No. 169 on 7 November 1987.
The single “Seattle” was released as a promo 12-inch single which entered the Billboard Hot Dance Club Play Songs charts, where it stayed for 7 weeks and reached No. 30 on 26 December 1987.
The single “Body” was released as a promo 12-inch single in early February 1988, but did not chart.

References 

1987 albums
Public Image Ltd albums
Virgin Records albums